The 1977 FIVB Men's World Cup was held from 17 to 29 November 1977 in Japan. It was the 3rd edition of the competition.

The FIVB Men’s World Cup made its final breakthrough when the decision was taken to hold the competition in Japan from that point on. The tournament was held there for the first time in 1977, and the mix of competitors from around the world was the most varied it had ever been. Only three of the twelve participating teams were from Europe. Soviet Union won their second title of World Cup.

Qualification

* Romania and Yugoslavia were replaced by Bulgaria and United States.

Results

First round

Pool A
Location: Fukuoka

|}

|}

Pool B
Location: Toyama

|}

|}

Pool C
Location: Sapporo

|}

|}

Pool D
Location: Sendai

|}

|}

Second round

Pool E
Location: Nagoya

|}

|}

Pool F
Location: Hiroshima

|}

|}

9th–12th places
Location: Sapporo

|}

|}

Final round

5th–8th places
Location: Tokyo

|}

|}

Final places
Location: Tokyo

|}

|}

Final standing

Awards

 Most Valuable Player
  Tomasz Wójtowicz
 Best Spiker
  Aleksandr Borisovich Savin
 Best Blocker
  Tomasz Wójtowicz

 Best Setter
  Katsutoshi Nekoda
 Best Defender
  Vyacheslav Zaytsev
 Best on the pitch
  Haruhiko Hanawa

References

FIVB Volleyball Men's World Cup
Men's World Cup